The NewLabour Party was a centre-left political party in New Zealand that operated from 1989 to 2000. It was founded by Jim Anderton, an member of parliament (MP) and former president of the New Zealand Labour Party.

NewLabour was established by a number of Labour Party members who left the party in reaction to "Rogernomics", the economic policies implemented by the Labour Party's Minister of Finance, Roger Douglas, which saw the traditionally left-leaning Labour Party swing heavily to the new right on issues of state intervention, regulation, and taxation. Anderton, who had been among the most vocal critics of Douglas, was joined by a number of other members of the Labour Party, such as Matt Robson, Laila Harré and Phil Amos, and a number of left-wing activists, such as Bruce Jesson. Anderton was the party's only MP before it joined the Alliance.

Electoral success
In the 1990 elections, NewLabour stood candidates in all electorates. The party gained a certain amount of support from disillusioned Labour voters, winning 5.16% of the vote. Anderton was NewLabour's only successful candidate, retaining the Sydenham seat in working-class south-central Christchurch. He remained the party's sole representative in Parliament, which was now dominated by the National Party with 67 seats out of 97.

Alliance building
In 1991, NewLabour and several other parties formed the Alliance, a broad left-wing coalition. Initially, NewLabour maintained a separate identity within the Alliance, keeping its own party organization intact. By 2000, however, many felt that maintaining parallel NewLabour and Alliance structures was counter-productive, and at NewLabour's October conference, it was decided to completely assimilate the party into the larger Alliance structure, marking the end of NewLabour as an autonomous group.

Former parliamentarians 
The following is a list of former parliamentarians:

MPs elected between 1991 and 2000 were members of the NewLabour Party's faction of the Alliance.

References

1989 establishments in New Zealand
2000 disestablishments in New Zealand
Defunct political parties in New Zealand
Defunct socialist parties
Democratic socialist parties in Oceania
Labour parties
Political parties disestablished in 2000
Political parties established in 1989
Socialist parties in New Zealand